Andrei Olegovich Lazukin (born 19 November 1997) is a Russian figure skater. He is the 2015 Bavarian Open champion, 2017 Triglav Trophy silver medalist, and 2018 CS Lombardia Trophy bronze medalist. Earlier in his career, he won gold at the 2014 ISU Junior Grand Prix in Germany.

Personal life 
Andrei Olegovich Lazukin was born on 19 November 1997 in Tolyatti, Russia. He dated fellow figure skater Elizaveta Tuktamysheva.

Career

Early career 
Lazukin began learning to skate in 2001. Making his ISU Junior Grand Prix (JGP) debut, he placed seventh in Linz, Austria, in September 2012. During the 2013 JGP series, he was sent to Mexico City, where he finished fifth.

In early October 2014, Lazukin won gold at the 2014 JGP event in Dresden, Germany. In November, he placed fifth at the 2014 CS Volvo Open Cup, an ISU Challenger Series event and his first senior international. He won gold at the Bavarian Open in February 2015.

Lazukin missed part of the 2015–2016 season due to a back injury. He finished fourth at the 2017 Russian Championships in Chelyabinsk and took the silver medal at the Triglav Trophy in April 2017.

2017–2018 season 
Lazukin started his season by competing in two ISU Challenger Series events. In mid-September he placed eighth at the 2017 CS Lombardia Trophy and in early October he finished eighth again in 2017 CS Finlandia Trophy. Two weeks later he made his Grand Prix debut at the 2017 Rostelecom Cup where he placed tenth. In December he skated his third Challenger event of the season at the 2017 CS Golden Spin of Zagreb where he placed sixth. In late December he finished seventh at the 2018 Russian Championships.

2018–2019 season 
In September Lazukin won the bronze medal at the 2018 CS Lombardia Trophy with a personal best score of 243.45 points. This medal was his first ISU Challenger Series medal. In early November he placed sixth at the 2018 Grand Prix of Helsinki. Two weeks later he finished seventh at the 2018 Rostelecom Cup.  At the 2019 Russian Championships, he debuted a new free skate to Pyotr Ilyich Tchaikovsky's Romeo and Juliet, finishing in fourth place overall.

In February 2019, he took silver at the 2019 Dragon Trophy in Ljubljana, Slovenia.  At the 2019 Russian Cup Final he won gold, placing first in the short program and six in the free.  In March 2019 Lazukin competed at the 2019 Winter Universiade placed third in the short program, fifth in the free program, and fifth overall.

Lazukin was assigned to the 2019 World Championships in Saitama, Japan, following the withdrawal of Maxim Kovtun.  Lazukin placed tenth, setting a new personal best in the free skating and total score.  He concluded the season at the 2019 World Team Trophy as part of the bronze medal-winning Team Russia.

2019–2020 season 
Beginning the season on the Challenger series, Lazukin placed twelfth at Lombardia and seventh at the Finlandia Trophy.

At his first Grand Prix assignment, Lazukin was sixth in the short program after a rough landing on his quad Lutz attempt and having to put a hand down on his triple Axel.  He placed last in the free skate after numerous errors, dropping to eighth place overall.  Lazukin was tenth at the 2019 Cup of China.  He then placed twelfth at the 2020 Russian Championships, where he was reported to be dealing with a knee injury.

Programs

Competitive highlights 
GP: Grand Prix; CS: Challenger Series; JGP: Junior Grand Prix

Detailed results 

Small medals for short and free programs awarded only at ISU Championships. At team events, medals awarded for team results only.

Senior level

Junior Level

References

External links 
 

1997 births
Russian male single skaters
Living people
Sportspeople from Tolyatti
Competitors at the 2017 Winter Universiade
Competitors at the 2019 Winter Universiade